Lemonade Mouth is a 2011 American teen musical drama television film, based on the 2007 novel of the same name by Mark Peter Hughes. The film was directed by Patricia Riggen and written by April Blair, and stars Bridgit Mendler, Adam Hicks, Naomi Scott, Hayley Kiyoko and Blake Michael. The film tells the story of five high school students who meet in detention and form a band to stand up for their beliefs and to overcome their individual and collective struggles.

The film premiered on April 15, 2011, on Disney Channel as a Disney Channel Original Movie. It received over 7 million views on its premiere night, and has been met with generally positive reviews, with praise going towards the acting ensemble, the script, Riggen’s direction, and themes of honesty, integrity, and self-expression. The film won the Popstar Award for Favorite TV Movie in 2011, and was also nominated for a Directors Guild of America Award and a Motion Picture Sound Editors Award.

The soundtrack of the same name was released in April 2011 to significant commercial success peaking at number 4 on the US Billboard 200 and number three on the US Top Digital Albums. Alike to the film, it was received positively by critics, who particularly praised its originality. The single "Determinate" received a JanNEWary Award for Best iTunes Song.

Plot
High school freshmen Olivia White, Mohini "Mo" Banjaree, Charles "Charlie" Delgado, Stella Yamada, and Wendell "Wen" Gifford all meet in detention. When Miss Reznick, the music teacher supervising detention, leaves to argue speak with the principal Mr. Brenigan, they then tap out a beat and play instruments with Olivia singing. Miss Reznick returns and encourages them to enter the upcoming Rising Star music competition, which popular band Mudslide Crush is also slated to perform in.

The band forms with Olivia as lead vocalist, Stella as lead guitarist/backing vocalist, Mo as bassist/backing vocalist, Wen as keyboardist/keytarist and rapping vocalist, and Charlie as drummer. At school, Olivia is ridiculed by Ray Beech, lead singer of Mudslide Crush, for her stage fright. Stella spits lemonade on Ray in defense, and he refers to the group as "Lemonade Mouth", giving the band its name. The band later discovers the lemonade machine they love is being removed from the school, to their horror. Stella enters the band in Rising Star as well as the upcoming Halloween Bash, much to Olivia's chagrin.

Mo breaks up with her boyfriend Scott Picket, Ray's best friend and Mudslide Crush's guitarist, after she catches him flirting with a cheerleader. Prior to performing at the Halloween Bash, Olivia suffers a panic attack. Her friends' encouragement eventually gives her the confidence to perform, after which Stella makes a speech opposing Brenigan's decision to remove the lemonade machine and encouraging self-expression to the supportive crowd. Angered, Principal Brenigan forbids them from playing at school. The next day, banners in support of Lemonade Mouth are posted around the school, raising their spirits.

When Olivia is absent from school one day, the band visits her at her house and learn that her cat Nancy, her only memory of her deceased mother, has died, leaving Olivia in an depressed state. They begin to grow closer to one another, opening up about each of their struggles. They also learn that their song "Determinate" is being played on the local radio. Shortly after, however, things begin to go downhill for the group; Mo gets the flu, Charlie breaks his fingers, Wen injures his eye while hanging up a picture with his dad, and Olivia loses her voice during an argument with Wen.

Stella calls the band to the school, where she is protesting the removal of the lemonade machine. The group gets into a heated argument with the men removing the machine. After being detained by police and contemplating the future of the band, they agree to perform at Rising Star. As each of their parents and guardians come to retrieve from the police station, they each reconcile their individual problems at home; Wen finally accepts his dad's girlfriend, Olivia gains the courage to send a letter to her incarcerated father, Mo gets her dad to accept her for who she is, Charlie realizes he doesn't have to live up to his older brother's prowess, and Stella realizes she doesn't have to be a genius to fit in with her family.

At Rising Star, Olivia and Mo's respective injuries begin to resurface during their performance. Olivia begins to have another panic attack, and Stella tries to comfort her to no avail. Dejected, the band is about to exit the stage when the audience began to sing their song to support them. Scott, fed up with Ray's hostile treatment towards Lemonade Mouth, leaves Mudslide Crush and plays his guitar alongside the audience, bringing Lemonade Mouth back onto the stage to successfully finish their performance.

Some time later, Mo and Scott have reconciled, and Charlie (who had developed a crush on Mo while forming the band) takes an interest in a new girl. At Wen's father's wedding, Stella recognizes the man sitting next to her as Mel, the owner of the lemonade machine company. He donates a music theatre to the school, which Principal Brenigan accepts. Olivia mails the entire story to her father. The film closes with Lemonade Mouth performing at Madison Square Garden, with Scott as their new rhythm guitarist.

Cast

 Bridgit Mendler as Olivia White, the lead singer of Lemonade Mouth, and struggles with anxiety. 
 Adam Hicks as Wendell "Wen" Gifford, the pianist and also a rapper for Lemonade Mouth
 Hayley Kiyoko as Stella Yamada, the lead guitarist for Lemonade Mouth
 Naomi Scott as Mohini "Mo" Banjaree, the bassist and singer for Lemonade Mouth
 Blake Michael as Charlie Delgado, the drummer for Lemonade Mouth
 Nick Roux as Scott Pickett, Mo's boyfriend Singer and rhythm guitarist for Mudslide Crush, later rhythm guitarist for Lemonade Mouth.
 Chris Brochu as Ray Beech. Lead singer for Mudslide Crush, who also frequently bullies Olivia 
 Tisha Campbell as Miss Jenny Reznick
 Christopher McDonald as Principal Stanley Brenigan
 Scott Takeda as Stella's Father
 Ariana Smythe as Sydney 
 Judith Rane as Brenda
 Isaac Kappy as Mel
 Ryan Montano as Tommy Delgado 
 Lauren Poole as Moxie Morris
 Bob Jesser as Mr. Gifford 
 Leedy Corbin as Georgie Gifford 
 Lance Capaldi as Ticket Taker
 Shishir Kurup as Mr. Banjaree, Mo's Dad
 Thomas Sanchez as Cop
 Johnie Hector as Coach
 Paul Clark as Andrew
 Caitlin Ribbans as Jules
 Phil Luna as Charlie's Dad
 Chiara Brokaw as Alex
 Lora Martinez-Cunningham as Charlie's Mom
 Jayna Sweet as Victoria
 Nicholas Martinez as Freshman Singer (Nick Martinez)

Author Mark Peter Hughes makes a cameo appearance as an extra dressed as a bee at the Halloween Bash.

Production

Production 
In 2010, Lemonade Mouth was announced by Disney Channel initially as an upcoming musical franchise (though it was released as a standalone film), and it was announced that Bridgit Mendler, Adam Hicks, Hayley Kiyoko, Naomi Scott were cast in the film, as well as actress Tisha Campbell-Martin and actor Christopher McDonald, were cast in the film. The names of eight characters in the book were changed for the film; the character of "Olivia Whitehead" was changed to "Olivia White", "Wendel Gifford" was changed to "Wendell Gifford", "Stella Penn" was changed to "Stella Yamada", "Mohini Banerjee" was changed to "Mohini Banjaree", and "Charlie Hirsh" was changed to "Charlie Delgado". Production began in August 2010, and filming took place in Albuquerque, New Mexico.

The extended edition of the DVD includes an interview with Moxie Morris on "All Things Musical", in which Mo and Scott's relationship is nearly exposed by Moxie in front of Mo's father, but is stopped by Olivia, who says that she and Wen are dating. The band then performs "Livin On A High Wire".

Music 

The movie features ten original songs, and was released by Walt Disney Records as a soundtrack album on April 12, 2011.

Release

Ratings and reception 

Lemonade Mouth was watched by 5.7 million viewers on its premiere night, ranking as the No. 1 TV Telecast among Kids 7–11 (2.3 million/9.4 rating) and Teens (2.1 million/8.5 rating), and cable's No. 1 original movie of 2011 among Total Viewers. With DVR viewing included, its total was 7.1 million viewers. A local premiere was held in the author Mark Peter Hughes's town of Wayland, Massachusetts. It was broadcast live by the town public access station, WayCAM.TV, by local students.

On the review aggregator website Rotten Tomatoes, 80% of reviews are positive. Family-oriented reviewers at Common Sense Media praised the film for its themes of honesty, empowerment, overcoming adversity, self-expression, standing up for what one believes in, and for its emphasis on the importance of the arts and of friendship and family. Emily Ashby of Common Sense Media wrote: "... Lemonade Mouth" is an uplifting celebration of the human spirit."

Online publishing-platform Medium wrote "Superb music, talented cast, good script, a well used production design budget — this one hit the nail on the head. More than that, we love the spirit of Lemonade Mouth. The outcasts fight for equality with the cool crowd and stand up against the powers that be with music." Reviewing site Plugged In wrote: "The message is as clear as the Disney castle is colorful: Stand up for what you believe in—no matter what that may be. (And get famous in the process!)"

Awards and nominations

Cancelled sequel
In 2011, the author of Lemonade Mouth said that he had been working on a sequel. Actor Blake Michael has said: "It's all up to the fans, it's in their hands. If people enjoy it and they love it and they want more, they'll get it. I think Disney is just a great organization in general and they're always one step ahead of the game. So you never really know what's gonna happen." On June 15, 2011, it was announced during the 2011 Licensing International Expo that Lemonade Mouth 2 was in the works.

On April 6, 2012, Chris Brochu announced on his Twitter account, that the sequel was no longer going into production. In interviews with Kidzworld Media and BSCKids in May 2012, Bridgit Mendler confirmed that a sequel would not be produced, noting that "they tried to figure something out for a sequel, but everyone at Disney felt like the movie had completed its story in the first movie."

See also 
 List of Disney Channel original films

References

External links

 
 

2010s high school films
2010s musical drama films
2010s teen drama films
2011 in American television
2011 television films
2011 films
American high school films
American musical drama films
American teen drama films
American teen musical films
Disney Channel Original Movie films
Films about musical groups
Films based on American novels
Films based on young adult literature
Films directed by Patricia Riggen
Films scored by Christopher Lennertz
Films set in Rhode Island
Films shot in New Mexico
American drama television films
2010s American films